Lee Jin-hee (born February 15, 1983) is a South Korean actress. Debuting in the play “Mother” in 2004, Lee has worked in variety of acting mediums, such as plays, musicals, movies and television dramas. She is also an actress with good acting reputation in Daehangno.

Early life 
Lee Jin-hee was born on February 15, 1983. Growing up, Lee considered several career choices, two of them were teacher or actress. Opportunity to pursue acting started when Lee transferred from a humanities major in high school to theater major in Gyewon Arts High School (계원예술고등학교) in Seongnam, Gyeonggi-do due to his father's job transfer. After graduated from High School, Lee enrolled to Department of Theater of Yong In University located in Samgak-dong, Cheoin-gu, Yongin-si, Gyeonggi-do, South Korea and her Bachelor Degree in Theater.

Career 
Lee started her journey as actress as member of the theater company Yeonhui Dangeori (연희단거리패). She debuted in 2004, with role young Il-soon in play Mother, lead by veteran actress . The play was performed as COEX Art Hall opening commemorative performance. She joined several other works with the troupe from 2004 to 2006, such as Acrobat's First Love and Deceived by Love and Crying for Money.

In 2007, She moved to Daehangno, Seoul. It was her dream role since high school. However Lee failed the audition.

So, instead, in January, Lee auditioned for Lee Kang-baek's The Cockscomb Flower that was Directed by Choi Joong-min. Lee got the role and then met director and playwright Jang Yoo-jung. Lee debut as musical actress with title role Choi Min-hee in Jang Yoo-jung's musical Oh, While you were sleeping, which was part of the repertoire of Yeonwoo Stage's.  Followed by title  role Ahn So-yi for Jang Yoo-jung's play Melodrama (2007). In November, her performance in those works, made Lee received an offer from Director Kwang-jin Yoon to appear in play Agnes of God. Lee finally met her dream role and acted as Agnes Jayu Small Theater at the Seoul Arts Center from December 8th, 2007.

In 2008, She worked with Director Seo Jae-hyung and Playwright Han Ahreum from Theater Company Run to Death (극단-죽도록 달린다) in play Hoya (호야(好夜)). Followed by play Applause for Julie, Youth, 18 to 1, and Tournament. From 2008 to 2010 Lee was part of special team for musical Oh, While you were sleeping.

From 2008 to 2010 Lee toured South Korea as part of casts of musical Those Days.

Career in film and television 
Lee cinematic debut was a minor role in 2020 feature film Finding Mr. Destiny. In 2013, She was cast in first leading role in feature film 48 Meters (2014) directed by director Min Baek-doo. 48 Meters is a human rights film based on the moving true story of those North Korean who risk death for freedom across the shortest distance of 48 meters across the Yalu River, which is called the distance between life and death. Lee took on the role of Ryu Hwa-young, who lost her parents while trying to escape from North Korea as a child. Lee played opposite of Park Hyo-joo who took the role of broker Park Seon-hee.

In between her theater works, Lee were doing many minor roles in small screen such as in SBS drama Glorious Day (2014), SBS drama Entertainer (2016) and tvN drama Memory (2016). In 2017 Lee was cast as supporting role in MBC mini-series Two Cops, for the role Woo Hye-in, the widow of detective Cho Hang-joon, former partner of detective Cha Dong-tak (starring Jo Jung-suk. In 2018, Lee done another MBC drama A Pledge to God as supporting role Na Hae-jim’s mother, Ha Ji-mo. In 2019 she returned in SBS drama series VIP. Her role is Kang Ji-young, the head of VIP concierge, an outspoken woman who is not afraid of her manager.

Her brief appearance the KBS drama When the Camellia Blooms as owner of tan salon and friend of Dong-baek were quite memorable. In episode 8 of the KBS drama Sell Your Haunted House (2021), Lee made friendship appearance as the mother of Won-gwi Byul-i, a child ghost. She also appeared in tvN drama series Hometown Cha-Cha-Cha episode 2 and episode 9 as Hye-jin's mother. 

In 2021 Lee joined television drama series Here's My Plan as Kim Bok-hee, a grandmother caregiver. This drama screenplay was winner of outstanding work at the 2020 MBC Drama Screenplay Contest and was selected with the highest praise from judges. It was aired on MBC TV from May 19–27, 2021.

Recent theater works 

In 2019, Lee returned with the play Turn around and leave. The two person play is based on the film A Promise, which was released in 1998 starring Park Shin-yang and Jeon Do-yeon. It depicts the story of a gangster Gong Sang-du who is about to turn himself in after committing a murder and goes to meet his lover Hee-joo for the last time.

In 2020, Lee was double cast as a woman in 'Lungs' with Kwak Sun-young. The play 'Lungs' is a two-person play made up of a conversation between a man and a woman, and they constantly talk about topics such as their feelings, childbirth, the environment, and the earth, and throw up topics.

In May 2022, it was announced that Lee will joined the third work of The 9th Best Plays Festival, play Touching the Void by David Greig. It is based on the true story of the survival of two British mountain climbers, Joe Simpson and Simon Yates. Son is double casts with actress Son Ji-yoon for role Sara, Joe Simpson’s sister. Korean premiere is directed by Kim Dong-yeon, and was performed at Art One Theater 2 in Daehangno from July 8 to September 9, 2022.

Personal life 
Lee Jin-hee met her husband, a fellow actor, Ahn Se-ho in Open Run Musical Oh! While You were Sleeping in 2007. They did many projects together afterward. They both are represented by the same agency Alien Company.

Filmography

Film

Television drama

Television series

Stage

Musical

Theater

Awards and nominations

Notes

References

External links 
 
 
 Lee Jin-hee at Daum Encyclopedia  
 Lee Jin-hee at Daum Movie  
 Lee Jin-hee at PlayDB  

Living people
1983 births
South Korean film actresses
South Korean musical theatre actresses
South Korean stage actresses
South Korean television actresses
20th-century South Korean actresses
21st-century South Korean actresses